Forget Me Not is an American lost 1917 silent film drama directed by Emile Chautard and starring Kitty Gordon.

Cast
Kitty Gordon - Stefanie Paoli
Montagu Love - Gabriel Barrato/Benedetto Barrato
Alec B. Francis - Marquis de Mohrivart
George MacQuarrie - Sir Horace Welby
James Furey - Sir Donald Verney
Norma Phillips - Rose Verney
Lillian Herbert - Alice Verney
Henrietta Simpson - Mrs. Foley

References

External links

1917 films
American silent feature films
Lost American films
Films directed by Emile Chautard
World Film Company films
American black-and-white films
Silent American drama films
1917 drama films
1917 lost films
Lost drama films
1910s American films